This is a list of roads designated A7 :

 A007 road (Argentina), a beltway around the city of Santa Fe
 A7 highway (Australia) may refer to :
 A7 highway (Queensland), a road connecting Georgetown and Springsure
 A7 highway (South Australia), a road connecting Adelaide central business district with Port Adelaide
 A7 highway (Tasmania), a road connecting Launceston and Greens Beach
 A7 motorway (Austria), a road connecting Linz and the Mühlviertel
 A7 motorway (Bulgaria), a road connecting Ruse and Makaza
 A7 motorway (Croatia), a road connecting Rijeka, Croatia to Slovenian border
 A7 motorway (Cyprus), a planned road intended to link Paphos with Polis
 A7 motorway (France), a road connecting Lyon and Marseille
 Bundesautobahn 7, a German road running between that country's border with Denmark to the Austrian border
 A7 motorway (Greece), a road in Peloponnese connecting the motorway intersection with Greek National Road 8A outside Corinth and ends at Kalamata
 A7 motorway (Italy), a road connecting Milan and Genoa
 A7 road (Latvia), a road connecting Riga, Bauska and the Lithuanian border 
 A7 highway (Lithuania), a road connecting Marijampolė and Kaliningradas
 A7 motorway (Luxembourg), a road connecting Luxembourg City and Clervaux
 A7 road (Malaysia), a road connecting Beaufort and Mempaku/Menumbok
 A7 motorway (Morocco), a road connecting Casablanca and Marrakesh
 A7 motorway (Netherlands), a road connecting Nieuweschans and Amsterdam
 A7 highway (Nigeria), a road connecting Ilorin to the border with Benin
 A7 motorway (Portugal), a road connecting Póvoa de Varzim and Vila Pouca de Aguiar
 A7 motorway (Romania), a road planned to connect Ploiești to the border with Ukraine at Siret
 A-7 motorway (Spain), a road connecting Algeciras to the border with France at La Jonquera
 A 7 road (Sri Lanka), a road connecting  Avissawella-Hatton-Nuwara Eliya
 A7 motorway (Switzerland), a road connecting Winterthur and Kreuzlingen
 A7 road (United Kingdom) may refer to :
 A7 road (Great Britain), a road connecting Edinburgh to Carlisle
 A7 road (Isle of Man), a road connecting Ballasalla with Port Erin
 A7 road (Northern Ireland), a road connecting Downpatrick and Carryduff
 A7 road (United States of America) may refer to :
 County Route A7 (California), a road in Tehama County connecting Live Oak Road and SR 36 in Red Bluff
 A7 road (Zimbabwe), a road connecting Hwange and Livingstone

See also
 List of highways numbered 7